Ruben R. Zackhras (4 December 1947 – 1 January 2019) was a Marshallese politician. He was acting President of the Marshall Islands from 21 October 2009 to 26 October 2009.  He previously served as Minister of Finance from 1992 to 1998.

Zackhras, graduated from the University of Guam in 1971 holding a BA in Public Administration, served in Marshallese politics for 36 years and in the Nitijela from 1979 to 2015, and served as a representative of Ailinglaplap Atoll. His initial political career was combined with his role as a teacher. He was elected to the Marshallese constitutional convention in 1977. He was appointment as Minister of Transportation and Communication in 1979. From 1982 Zackhras was appointed as minister of Transportation and Communication, Interior and Outer Island Affairs, Justice and Health & Environment, until his appointment in 1989 as Minister of Finance. In the year of 2000, Zackhras was elected as deputy speaker of the Nitijela serving until 2007.

Zackhras served as Minister in Assistance to former president Litokwa Tomeing until Tomeing was ousted in the country's first successful vote of no confidence against a sitting president on 21 October 2009. The Speaker of the Nitijela, Jurelang Zedkaia, appointed Zackhras as the acting president of the Marshall Islands until new presidential elections could be held. Zackhras remained acting President until 26 October 2009, when Jurelang Zedkaia was elected as President by the Nitijela. Zackhras was subsequently appointed as Minister in Assistance to the President of Jurelang Zedkaia and served until January 2012. He was appointed as the ambassador to Fiji by President Hilda Heine, and held that position until his death.

Zackhas died of cancer on 1 January 2019 in Hawaii, United States, aged 71.

He was member of the United Democratic Party. Mattlan Zackhras was his son.

References

1947 births
2019 deaths
Members of the Congress of the Trust Territory of the Pacific Islands
Presidents of the Marshall Islands
Ministers in Assistance to the President of Marshall Islands
Communication ministers of the Marshall Islands
Environment ministers of the Marshall Islands
Finance ministers of the Marshall Islands
Health ministers of the Marshall Islands
Interior ministers of the Marshall Islands
Justice ministers of the Marshall Islands
Transport ministers of the Marshall Islands
University of Guam alumni
Members of the Legislature of the Marshall Islands
People from the Ralik Chain
United Democratic Party (Marshall Islands) politicians
Ambassadors of the Marshall Islands